Elsschot may refer to:

 Willem Elsschot (1882–1960), a Flemish writer and poet
 6309 Elsschot, an asteroid named after the writer